Tsintaa Yiti Ii is a populated place situated in Apache County, Arizona, United States.

References

Populated places in Apache County, Arizona